Lê Văn Sơn (born 20 December 1996) is a Vietnamese footballer who plays as a right back for V-League club Becamex Bình Dương, on loan from Hoàng Anh Gia Lai.

International goals

U-19

Honours
Vietnam U19
AFF U-19 Youth Championship: Runner-up 2013, 2014,
Hassanal Bolkiah Trophy: Runner-up 2014
Vietnam U21
International U-21 Thanh Niên Newspaper Cup: Runner-up 2017

References 

1996 births
Living people
Vietnamese footballers
Association football fullbacks
V.League 1 players
Hoang Anh Gia Lai FC players
Ho Chi Minh City FC players
Becamex Binh Duong FC players
People from Hải Dương province